is a city in Aichi Prefecture, Japan. , the city had an estimated population of 306,764, and a population density of 3,306 persons per km2. The city is sometimes called Owarikasugai to avoid confusion with other municipality of the same name, including Kasugai (now part of Fuefuki) in Yamanashi Prefecture.

Geography
Kasugai is located in northwest Aichi Prefecture, north of the Nagoya metropolis, in the northern Nōbi Plain.
The Shōnai River flows through the southern portion of the city.

Climate
The city has a climate characterized by hot and humid summers, and relatively mild winters (Köppen climate classification Cfa).  The average annual temperature in Kasugai is 15.8 °C. The average annual rainfall is 1681 mm with September as the wettest month. The temperatures are highest on average in August, at around 28.2 °C, and lowest in January, at around 4.3 °C.

Demographics
Per Japanese census data, the population of Kasugai has increased rapidly over the past 70 years with the 1960s being the fastest growing decade.

Surrounding municipalities
Aichi Prefecture
Nagoya（Kita-ku, Moriyama-ku）
Inuyama
Komaki
Seto
Toyoyama
Gifu Prefecture
Tajimi

History
The area which is now Kasugai contains many Kofun period burial mounds. During the Edo period, the area was mostly part of the holdings of Owari Domain.

With the Meiji period establishment of the modern municipalities system, the area was organized into villages under Higashikasugai District, including the village of Kachigawa on October 1, 1889. Kachigawa was raised to town status on July 25, 1900. On June 1, 1943, Kachigawa was merged with neighboring villages of Toriimatsu and Shinogi to form the city of Kasugai, and in 1958, Kasugai annexed the neighboring towns of Sakashita and Kōzōji. 

Kasugai gained special city status on April 1, 2001, with increased local autonomy.

Government

Mayor-council
Kasugai has a mayor-council form of government with a directly elected mayor and a unicameral city legislature of 32 members.

Prefectural Assembly
The city contributes four members to the Aichi Prefectural Assembly.

House of Representatives
In terms of national politics, the city is part of Aichi District 6 of the lower house of the Diet of Japan.

External relations

Twin towns – Sister cities

International
Sister City

National
Disaster Alliance city

Economy

Due to its location, Kasugai is increasingly becoming a bedroom community for the greater Nagoya metropolis.

In terms of agricultural production, Kasugai is noted for horticulture and produces over 80% of the cactus sold as houseplants. Oji Paper Company, Panasonic and Fujitsu have large factories in Kasugai. There are also several shopping centers in Kasugai, including APiTA Kōzōji (SUN MARCHÉ), Æon Kasugai shopping center, Shimizuya, and The Mall Kasugai.

Companies headquartered in Kasugai include Aichi Electric, Amiyaki Tei, Daito ME, Chita Kogyo, Toyo Electric Corporation, KDK (Panasonic Ecology Systems), Panasonic Industrial Devices SUNX, Fine Sinter, and Mitsuchi Corporation.

Education

University
Colleges and universities:
 Chubu University
 Meijo University, Kasugai campus

Primary and secondary education
 Kasugai has 37 public elementary schools and15 public junior high schools operated by the city government, and seven public high schools operated by the Aichi Prefectural Board of Education. There are also one private junior high schools and one private high school. The prefecture also operates two special education schools for the handicapped.

International schools
  – North Korean school

Transportation

Airways

Airports
Nagoya Airfield

Railways

Conventional lines
 Central Japan Railway Company
Chūō Main Line： –  –  –  –  –
 Meitetsu
Komaki Line：-  –  –  –  –
 Tōkai Transport Service Company
Jōhoku Line： –  –
 Aichi Loop Railway
Aichi Loop Line： –

Expressway

Highways
 Tōmei Expressway
 Chūō Expressway
 Nagoya Dai-Ni Kanjo Expressway（Meinikan）

Japan National Route

Local attractions 

Castle
 Jōjō Castle ruins
 Ōdome Castle
 Yoshida Castle
Buddhist temple
 Enpuku-ji temple
 Kōzō-ji temple
 Mitsuzō-in temple
 Rinsyō-in temple
 Shintoku-ji temple
 Taigaku-ji temple

Shinto shrines
 Itahato Jinja
 Hakusan Jinja
 Matsubara Jinja
 Sakashita Jinja
 Utsutsu Jinja

Archaeological sites
 Ajiyoshi Futagoyama Kofun
Library
 Kasugai city library
Park
 Greenpia Kasugai
 Ochiai Park

Notable residents 
 Eiji Okuda, actor and director
 Takehiro Donoue, professional baseball player
 Naomichi Donoue, professional baseball player
 Sho Ito, professional soccer player
 Asahiyutaka Katsuteru, sumo wrestler
 Kousei Amano, actor
Jurina Matsui, actress
 Gaku Hasegawa, politician
 Company Matsuo, pornographic movie actor/director

References

External links 

   (with some portions in English)

 
Cities in Aichi Prefecture